North Dakota Highway 46 (ND 46) is a  road in eastern North Dakota, crossing the Red River Valley between Streeter and Oxbow. I-29 borders it on the east and ND 30 borders it on the west.

Major intersections

References

External links

The North Dakota Highways Page by Chris Geelhart
North Dakota Signs by Mark O'Neil

046
Transportation in Stutsman County, North Dakota
Transportation in Barnes County, North Dakota
Transportation in Cass County, North Dakota